The Hundred Days War (Harb Al-Mia'at Yaoum, French: La Guerre des Cent Jours) was a subconflict within the 1977–82 phase of the Lebanese Civil War which occurred in the Lebanese capital Beirut. It was fought between the allied Christian Lebanese Front militias, under the command of the Kataeb Party's President Bachir Gemayel, and the Syrian troops of the Arab Deterrent Force (ADF).

Background

In January 1976, the Phalange joined the main Christian parties – National Liberal Party (NLP), Lebanese Renewal Party (LRP), Marada Brigade, Al-Tanzim, and others – in a loose coalition, the Lebanese Front, designed to act as a political counterweight to the predominantly Muslim Lebanese National Movement (LNM) – Palestine Liberation Organization (PLO) alliance.  In order to deal with the Syrian military intervention of June 1976 and better coordinate the military operations of their respective militias, Christian militia leaders agreed to form in August that year a joint military command (a.k.a. the "Command Council") whose new collective name was the "Lebanese Forces" (LF).
From the very beginning, it became clear that the Lebanese Front's Command Council was dominated by the Phalange and its KRF militia under the charismatic leadership of Bachir Gemayel, who sought to unify the various Christian militias.  From 1977 onwards, Bachir began implementing the controversial "unification of the rifle" policy, using the LF to build a new power base for himself, distinct from that of the Phalange or any of the other traditional rightist parties. However, Bachir's actions soon put him on a direct collision course with Syria. Relations between the LF command and Damascus had already become frosty as a consequence of the ADF's growing unwillingness to either suppress the LNM-PLO alliance militias in west Beirut altogether or allow the Christian militias to do so.

The hundred days' war

February 1978
After a series of bomb attacks that rocked Beirut on early February 1978, the ADF stepped up its security measures by increasing the number of patrols and checkpoints in the streets.  On the 7th, Lebanese soldiers belonging to the Army of Free Lebanon (AFL) – a breakaway faction of the Lebanese Army led by the rightist dissident Colonel Antoine Barakat – objected to the ADF establishing a checkpoint near their HQ at the main Fayadieh barracks, a fortress-like military facility located in the namesake Christian district.
The ADF detachment, which comprised twenty Syrian regular soldiers, refused to move out, causing an argument which ended with a shootout on which 19 people lost their lives.  The Syrian soldiers were taken prisoner by the AFL regulars and held hostage at Fayadieh barracks, and the situation grew tenser that dawn when the bodies of two slain Christians were found nearby.

The next day, Syrian ADF infantry units backed by artillery surrounded and bombarded the AFL fortified barracks, setting part of the complex on fire.

Kataeb Regulatory Forces 'Commando' troops under the command of Bachir Gemayel and the Tigers Militia led by Dany Chamoun were drawn into the action against the Syrians. That afternoon the Syrian Army shelled Achrafieh and attacked the Tigers' HQ, located at the Sodeco quarter in Achrafieh. The fighting soon spread to east of Beirut and Mount Lebanon. The Syrians took some high-rise buildings such as the Burj Rizk in Achrafieh and the Burj El-Murr using snipers and heavy weapons against civilians. The soldiers stayed for 90 days.

Another major clash took place near the Sodeco area in Achrafieh where the Christian militias fought ferociously and drove the Syrians out of the Rizk Building.
This threatened the 4th Mechanized brigade of encirclement and capture by the Maronite militias.

March 1978

April 1978
In April, rightist leaders accused the ADF of bias when it intervened to contain the clashes across the Green Line between the Christian-held Ain el-Rammaneh and Muslim-held Chyah districts of Beirut.

Consequences
However, the LF attack on the pro-Syrian Marada Brigade militia of the Frangieh Clan that summer, which culminated in the infamous Ehden massacre, provoked another round of fighting in June–July.  President Elias Sarkis threatened to resign in protest over the Syrian bombardment of East Beirut, but later withdrew his resignation when the shelling stopped.
More fighting erupted in the fall, again followed by a ceasefire. In October 1978, the Foreign Ministers of Lebanon and those Arab League states contributing to the ADF – Syria, Saudi Arabia, Kuwait, Sudan, Qatar and the UAE – met at the town of Beiteddine, in the Chouf District south-east of Beirut. The outcome of the meeting was essentially a reaffirmation of the role of the ADF and a strong condemnation of those dealing with Israel. This meeting, and subsequent discussions between Syria and Saudi Arabia led to the lifting of the siege of Achrafieh by the Syrians and the withdrawal of all Syrian troops from East Beirut, being replaced by Saudi and Sudanese ADF troops, whom the Lebanese Front leaders viewed as more impartial and less hostile towards the Christians than the Syrian forces. The settlement was welcomed by the Lebanese Front parties and marked the end of the clashes.

See also
 Army of Free Lebanon
 Battle of the Hotels
 Lebanese Civil War
 Lebanese Forces
 Lebanese Front
 List of weapons of the Lebanese Civil War

References

Bibliography

 Edgar O'Ballance, Civil War in Lebanon, 1975–92, Palgrave Macmillan, London 1998. 
 Itamar Rabinovich, The war for Lebanon, 1970–1985, Cornell University Press, Ithaca and London 1989 (revised edition). 
 Joseph Hokayem, L'armée libanaise pendant la guerre: un instrument du pouvoir du président de la République (1975–1985), Lulu.com, Beyrouth 2012. , (in French) – L'armée libanaise pendant la guerre: un instrument du pouvoir du président de la République (1975–1985)
 Jonathan Randall, Going All the Way: Christian Warlords, Israeli Adventurers and the War in Lebanon, Just World Books 2012. 
 Moustafa El-Assad, Civil Wars Volume 1: The Gun Trucks, Blue Steel books, Sidon 2008. 
 Rex Brynen, Sanctuary and Survival: the PLO in Lebanon, Boulder: Westview Press, Oxford 1990.  – Sanctuary and Survival: The PLO in Lebanon
 Paul Jureidini, R. D. McLaurin, and James Price, Military operations in selected Lebanese built-up areas, 1975–1978, Aberdeen, MD: U.S. Army Human Engineering Laboratory, Aberdeen Proving Ground, Technical Memorandum 11-79, June 1979.
 Samer Kassis, 30 Years of Military Vehicles in Lebanon, Beirut: Elite Group, 2003. 
 Samer Kassis, Véhicules Militaires au Liban/Military Vehicles in Lebanon 1975–1981, Trebia Publishing, Chyah 2012.

External links
 The 100 Days War, the Battle of Ashrafieh – Lebanese Forces official site
 Chamussy (René) – Chronique d'une guerre: Le Liban 1975-1977 – éd. Desclée – 1978 (in French)
 Histoire militaire de l'armée libanaise de 1975 à 1990 (in French)

Conflicts in 1978
Battles of the Lebanese Civil War
1978 in Lebanon